is the title of the first installment of the 2009 editions of the long-running Kamen Rider Series of tokusatsu dramas. Decade, as its title suggests, is the tenth of the Heisei Rider special anniversary Series, having begun with Kamen Rider Kuuga, it was also the final installment of the Heisei era's first phase. in 2000. It began broadcasting the week following the finale of Kamen Rider Kiva and was featured in Super Hero Time alongside the 2009 edition of the Super Sentai Series, Samurai Sentai Shinkenger and replaced by Tensou Sentai Goseiger. Kamen Rider Zi-O, the last Heisei era series of 2018-2019, acts as a spiritual sequel, where both Decade and Diend play prominent roles as re-occurring side characters who are directly involved in that series plotline.

Production And Casting
The Kamen Rider Decade trademark was registered by Toei on July 29, 2008.

Masahiro Inoue, who portrayed Keigo Atobe in the Prince of Tennis musicals, was cast in the lead role for Decade as Tsukasa Kadoya/Kamen Rider Decade. Also involved were Kanna Mori as Natsumi Hikari/Kamen Rider Kivala, and Renji Ishibashi as Natsumi's grandfather Eijiro Hikari. Another member of the cast was Tatsuhito Okuda as the mysterious Narutaki. The world of Kamen Rider Kuuga, as well as most of the other Rider Worlds, sport several characters who have been renamed and cast with different actors. Ryota Murai was cast as Yusuke Onodera who is the series' version of Kamen Rider Kuuga. Rounding up the cast was Kimito Totani who portrayed the thief Daiki Kaito/Kamen Rider Diend.

Synopsis

The story follows Tsukasa Kadoya, an amnesiac photographer in the World of Natsumi. During an attack of many different Kaijin from throughout the Heisei Kamen Rider history Tsukasa becomes Kamen Rider Decade. He then learns that he needs to save the World of Natsumi by traveling to the nine AR worlds, meaning other rider worlds or alternate reality worlds. He begins traveling through the worlds with his friend Natsumi and her grandfather. However, he later begins traveling with Yusuke Onodera from the World of Kuuga, Kivala from the World of Kiva, and Daiki Kaito from the World of Diend, who can transform into Kamen Rider Diend. While journeying through the worlds Tsukasa and his companions meet Narutaki, a man who believes Tsukasa is the destroyer of worlds. They also begin running into Dai-Shocker, an alliance of terrorist organizations from across the many worlds. Will Tsukasa and his companions save the many worlds and stop Dai-Shocker, or will Tsukasa become the prophesied destroyer of worlds? 

To fit with the printing motif of the series, the main Kamen Riders of the series follow the CMYK color model: Decade is magenta, Diend is cyan, and Kuuga (Rising Ultimate Form) is black and yellow. In the Cho-Den-O Trilogy film Episode Yellow: Treasure de End Pirates, Diend is the primary character, emphasizing the yellow accents on his DienDriver and the enhanced Kamen Rider Diend card.

Rider War
However, Kuuga survived the initial battle, assuming Ultimate Form to confront Decade once again with the two seemingly destroying each other in the ensuing battle. As Narutaki explains to Natsumi, the dream is a predestined event in which Decade will destroy all the worlds.

Episodes

Generally, episodes of Decade are titled similarly to the episodes of the series that they reference. Kamen Rider Kuugas episodes were titled with only two kanji and episodes of Kamen Rider Kiva have a musical reference and musical notation in the title. For the World of Hibiki story arc, the episode title cards are stylized in calligraphy similar to the styles featured in Kamen Rider Hibiki. For the World of Amazon story arc, the episode title had a reference from Kamen Rider Amazon episode 3. An episode arc also features a crossover with Samurai Sentai Shinkenger.

In an interview in the March 2009 issue of Kindai Magazine, Masahiro Inoue stated that Decade was slated as having only 30 episodes. A subsequent interview in Otonafami magazine confirmed that only 30 episodes were filmed, with 31 episodes airing in total.

Films

The Onigashima Warship

 was released on May 1, 2009. The film takes place between episodes 15 and 16 of Decade and primarily features the cast characters from Kamen Rider Den-O in their new media franchise, the Cho-Den-O Series.

All Riders vs. Dai-Shocker

The film  opened in Japanese theaters on August 8, 2009, double-booked with the Shinkenger film. The film is billed as featuring twenty-six Kamen Riders: the original ten Showa Riders, Black, Black RX, Shin, ZO, J, the previous nine titular Heisei Riders, Decade, and Diend, serving as a tribute to the entire Kamen Rider franchise as a whole. It also features the first on-screen appearance of the 11th Heisei Kamen Rider: Kamen Rider Double. The film provides light to Tsukasa's past and Decade's relation with the mysterious Dai-Shocker organization, whose membership is composed of the various villains and monsters that previous Kamen Riders battled with. The events of the movie take place between episodes 29 and 30.

Movie War 2010

As part of the  triple feature, Decades film  tells the story of what happens following the television series' cliffhanger finale, and was released in Japanese theaters on December 12, 2009 (initially hinted during a post credits trailer after All Riders vs. Dai-Shocker). Kamen Rider W was also featured in the sequence. The October issue of TV-Kun also makes reference to this movie, stating that . Gackt once again performed the film's theme song, "Stay the Ride Alive" that was released on January 1, 2010.

Super Hero Taisen

 is a film which features a crossover between the characters of the Kamen Rider and Super Sentai Series, including the protagonists of Kamen Rider Decade and Kaizoku Sentai Gokaiger alongside the casts of Kamen Rider Fourze, Kamen Rider OOO, and Tokumei Sentai Go-Busters. Masahiro Inoue and Kimito Totani reprised their roles as Tsukasa Kadoya and Daiki Kaito, along with Tatsuhito Okuda as Narutaki and Doktor G.

Kamen Rider Taisen

 made its theater debut on March 29, 2014. Masahiro Inoue, playing Kamen Rider Decade, alongside many other lead actors of other series appear in the film, including Gaku Sano of Kamen Rider Gaim, Renn Kiriyama of Kamen Rider W, Kohei Murakami and Kento Handa of Kamen Rider 555, Shunya Shiraishi from Kamen Rider Wizard, Ryo Hayami of Kamen Rider X, and Hiroshi Fujioka of the original Kamen Rider. The Sentai teams' Ressha Sentai ToQger and Ryo Ryusei as Daigo Kiryu from Zyuden Sentai Kyoryuger are also in the movie. Shun Sugata playing Kamen Rider ZX from the Birth of the 10th! Kamen Riders All Together!! TV special returns, also performing as Ambassador Darkness. Itsuji Itao of Kamen Rider The First plays Ren Aoi, Kamen Rider Fifteen, a main antagonist of the film.

Kamen Rider G
In addition to commemorating the 10th anniversary of the Heisei Kamen Rider Series, Kamen Rider Decade was broadcast during the 50th anniversary of TV Asahi broadcasting. In a collaboration with popular band SMAP, TV Asahi and Ishimori Productions put forward a special production for SMAP's SmaSTATION talk show titled . It premiered on January 31, 2009.

Kamen Rider G featured several actors from previous Kamen Rider programs in cameos. Kohei Murakami of Kamen Rider 555 fame played a medical experiment subject. Mitsuru Karahashi (also from 555) and Kenji Matsuda (from Hibiki and Kiva) portrayed members of the Shade terrorist cell. Kazutoshi Yokoyama and Eitoku, two suit actors commonly used by the Kamen Rider production team portrayed security guards in the TV Asahi building. Voice actor Katsumi Shiono provides vocal effects for the Phylloxera Worm, as he often does for Kamen Rider monsters. Popular TV Asahi announcer Yoko Ooshita also makes an appearance in Kamen Rider G as herself.

The original characters for Kamen Rider G are all wine-themed. The titular character's transformation requires a bottle of wine to be inserted into a transformation belt that acts as a wine opener, and he is armed with a sword that resembles a corkscrew as well as a sommelier knife. The letter "G" in the title is taken to either meaning "Good", referring to the actor Goro Inagaki, or as an onomatopoeia of the sound of wine being poured out of a bottle. The Phylloxera Worm would later be used as the antagonist for the Kamen Rider Kabuto episodes of Decade.

Within the small production, a terrorist organization known as  takes over the TV Asahi studios in Tokyo. The group led by Daidō Oda (Yusuke Kamiji) demands that the Japanese government release their leader Seizan Tokugawa (Show Aikawa), who was arrested after the group's human experimentations came to light. The Shade cell is assisted by the brainwashed Goro (SMAP's Goro Inagaki), but when he sees that his girlfriend Eri Hinata (Yumiko Shaku) is amongst the hostages, he regains his memories and turns on the Shade terrorists. Oda is forced to reveal himself as the Phylloxera Worm, and reveals that several other Shade members have been converted into Worms. Goro transforms into Kamen Rider G to take on the Worms, defeating them all save for Phylloxera who is much too strong for him. Just then, Kamen Rider Decade and the other Heisei Kamen Riders appear to give Kamen Rider G the confidence he needs to destroy the Phylloxera Worm with his Swirling Rider Kick. As the Phylloxera Worm says in his last breath that the war is not over, Goro reunites with Eri before proclaiming he will protect the world from Shade's evil influence.

Super Adventure DVD
The  called  is the Hyper Battle DVD for Decade. Like Kivas DVD, it is another "Choose Your Own Adventure" style story. The viewer's choices throughout the DVD affect how Decade and Diend's fight against Dai-Shocker's  as well as Yusuke Onodera's completion of the Decade Bazooka weapon from a punch out sheet in the back of a Televi-Kun magazine. The events of the specials take place between episodes 29 and 30.

World of Stronger
For Decades S.I.C Hero Saga side story  tells of how Tsukasa and the Hikari Studio crew enter the reality in which Kamen Rider Stronger takes place and meet up with the characters within, such as the original Yuriko Misaki. The first episode was published in Hobby Japan, June 2010.

Novel
, written by Aki Kanehiro and supervised by Toshiki Inoue, is part of a series of spin-off novel adaptions of the Heisei Era Kamen Riders. The novel was released on April 12, 2013.

Cast
 : 
 : 
 : 
 : 
 : 
 : 
 : 
 : 
 DecaDriver Voice, DienDriver Voice, K-Touch Voice: 
 Narration:

Guest stars

 : 
 : 
 : 
 : 
 : 
 : 
 : 
 : 
 : 
 : 
 : 
 : 
 : 
 : 
 : 
 : 
 : 
 : 
 : 
 : 
 : 
 : 
 , : 
 : 
 : 
 : 
 : 
 : 
 : 
 : 
 : 
 : 
 : 
 : 
 : 
 : 
 : 
 : 
 : 
 : 
 : 
 : 
 : 
 : 
 : 
 : 
 : 
 :

Songs
Opening theme
 "Journey Through the Decade"
 Lyrics: Shoko Fujibayashi
 Composition: Ryo (of defspiral)
 Arrangement: Kōtarō Nakagawa, Ryo
 Artist: Gackt
Episodes: Nine Worlds arc (first verse), New Worlds arc (second verse)
In its first week on the Oricon Weekly Charts, "Journey Through the Decade" reached the #2 spot, having sold approximately 51,666 records in that time.

Insert themes
 "Ride the Wind"
 Lyrics: Shoko Fujibayashi
 Composition & Arrangement: Shuhei Naruse
 Artist: Tsukasa Kadoya (Masahiro Inoue)
 Episodes: 10 - 22, 28
Masahiro Inoue had been recording "Ride the Wind" with Shuhei Naruse released on April 22, 2009. Prior to its appearance in the series, Inoue announced the song on his blog and that he would record it under his character's name.
 "Treasure Sniper"
 Lyrics: Shoko Fujibayashi
 Composition & Arrangement: Ryo
 Artist: Daiki Kaito (Kimito Totani)
 Episodes: 23 - 27, 29 - 31
On June 23, 2009, Kimito Totani announced on his personal blog that he was recording a new song for Decade. The Toei blog for Decade announced its title was "Treasure Sniper". Although "Treasure Sniper" did not have a release as a single, it and its instrumental are included on the MASKED RIDER DECADE COMPLETE CD-BOX boxed set. It was later released as the B-side to the single "Climax-Action ~The Den-O History~", the theme song for the Cho-Den-O Trilogy film in which Kamen Rider Diend is the main character.

Avex Group, as part of Decades soundtrack, released a series of albums featuring the songs of the previous nine Heisei Rider series titled the Masked Rider series Theme song Re-Product CD SONG ATTACK RIDE series. Each album features the original opening theme song, as well as a rearrangement of each by "Kamen Rider's official band" Rider Chips and by "Climax Jump" composer Shuhei Naruse. The first album, released on May 20, 2009, features  originally performed by Masayuki Tanaka for Kamen Rider Kuuga, "Break the Chain" originally performed by Tourbillon for Kamen Rider Kiva, and "Alive A life" originally performed by Rica Matsumoto for Kamen Rider Ryuki. The second album, released on June 24, 2009, features "Round ZERO~BLADE BRAVE" originally performed by Nanase Aikawa for Kamen Rider Blade, "Justiφ's" originally performed by Issa of Da Pump for Kamen Rider 555, and  originally performed by Shinichi Ishihara for Kamen Rider Agito.

Gackt performed the theme to the film Kamen Rider Decade: All Riders vs. Dai-Shocker. The song is titled "The Next Decade", and was released on August 11, 2009.

References

External links
 
 
  at Toei Company
  at Avex Group

2009 Japanese television series debuts
2009 Japanese television series endings
Crossover tokusatsu television series
Decade
Television series about parallel universes
Fiction about amnesia